Dominik Meichtry (born November 18, 1984) is a Swiss competitive swimmer specializing in the middle distance freestyle events. He currently holds six Swiss national records (long course and short course).

Meichtry has won 31 individual Swiss national medals, 25 gold, 6 silver. He has been competing on the international stage since the 2002 European Championships in Berlin. He was voted as Switzerland's top 10 male Athletes in 2008 and won athlete of the year in his canton of St. Gallen.

College

Meichtry committed to the University of California, Berkeley in the spring of 2004 and started school in January 2005. He was a multiple All-American for the California Golden Bears swimming and diving team, and placed 2nd at the 2007 National Collegiate Athletic Association (NCAAs) competition. He was voted team captain of the CAL men's swim team his junior and senior year guiding the bears to a 4th-place finish at the 2008 NCAAs.
Meichtry graduated in spring 2009 with a degree in psychology and sociology.

Meichtry trained at The Race Club, a summer swimming camp founded by Olympic Swimmers Gary Hall, Jr. and his father, Gary Hall, Sr. The Race Club, originally known as "The World Team," was designed to serve as a training group for elite swimmers across the world in preparation for the 2000 Sydney Olympic Games. To be able to train with the Race Club, one must either have been ranked in the top 20 in the world the past 3 calendar years or top 3 in their nation in the past year. The Race Club included such well known swimmers as Roland Mark Schoeman, Mark Foster, Ryk Neethling, and Therese Alshammar.

2008

Meichtry broke out on the international stage at the 2008 Summer Olympics in Beijing, where he swam the 8th fastest time ever recorded in the 200m Freestyle event. In the process, he beat the likes of Michael Phelps—who may not have been swimming his fastest in a quarter finals—to become the first Swiss swimmer to be the top seed going into semi finals. In the 200m Freestyle final he finished sixth in the event (Phelps won the event, finishing more than 2-1/2 seconds ahead of Meichtry). Meichtry also became the first Swiss to break the 49 second barrier when he led off the 4x100 Freestyle relay in 48.96. Later in the competition he lowered his own record to 48.55 in the 100 Freestyle event.

In December 2008 Meichtry won his first international medal at the 2008 European Short Course Swimming Championships in Rijeka, Croatia. He won the silver medal in the 200m Freestyle and missed out on the European crown by 0.02s.

2009 – present

Meichtry moved his training base to Southern California in fall of 2009 to train with Dave Salo for Trojan Swim Club out of the University of Southern California. Under the guidance of Dave Salo, Meichtry qualified for his 3rd Olympic Games at the 2011 World Aquatics Championships in Shanghai, China. There he placed 7th in the 200m Freestyle in a time of 1:47.02 and swam a new national record in the 100m Butterfly event.

Personal bests

Long Course (50m)

Short Course (25m)

Personal life
Meichtry married American Olympic swimmer Jessica Hardy on October 5, 2013.

See also
 The Race Club

References

External links
 
 
 Dominik Meichtry Photo Gallery @ MAGICPBK

1984 births
Living people
California Golden Bears men's swimmers
Swiss male butterfly swimmers
Swiss male freestyle swimmers
Swimmers at the 2004 Summer Olympics
Swimmers at the 2008 Summer Olympics
Swimmers at the 2012 Summer Olympics
Olympic swimmers of Switzerland
Sportspeople from St. Gallen (city)
21st-century Swiss people